Ialoni is a women's vocal ensemble based in Tbilisi, Georgia, whose repertoire covers  traditional Georgian polyphonic church chant, folk and urban genres. It has been led since its formation in 2009 by musicologist Nino Naneishvili, has performed internationally, and has won national awards for folk and church chant.

History
The ensemble was founded in 2009 by Nino Naneishvili, initially with the aim of studying and popularizing Georgian sacred chant, in particular the female chant tradition. Their early repertoire drew on archive material from the National Centre of Manuscripts and the Chant Centre of the Georgian Patriarchy, and their second album, Ghmerti Upali and Sunday Hymns, 8 Tones, included part recordings of each hymn, to help other choirs to learn the pieces. They have been pioneering the performance by women of pieces hitherto exclusively performed by male ensembles. Ialoni is part of the revival of Georgia's traditional sacred music, which has been emerging from its repression during Soviet rule. 

Since 2018, Ialoni has been collaborating with London's Rose Bruford College of Theatre & Performance, and other UK-based choirs, sharing master classes and joint concerts.

Etymology
The ensemble's name, Ialoni, is a Gurian and Imeretian dialect word meaning first light of day.

Awards
The ensemble was awarded Best Female Folk Ensemble at the National Folklore Festival of Georgia 2015-2016, organized by the State Center of Folklore of Georgia and the Ministry of Culture and Monument Protection of Georgia.

At the 2017 Tbilisi Choral Music Competition, the choir was awarded the Grand Prix in Georgian Traditional Chant, and the first place and Gold Medal in Georgian Folk Song.

Discography
The ensemble has released the following albums:
 Chants of Holy Mary, 2010
 Ghmerti Upali and Sunday Hymns, 8 Tones, (double CD), 2011
 From Sunrise to Sunset (CD & DVD), 2016
 I Fell in Love with that Sweet Voice, 2018
 Healing Songs and Lullabies, 2020
 Don't Think I Would Ever Forget You, 2021

Film and TV
The ensemble provided hymns for Nana Janelidze’s 2009 film Knights  of  Chant.

Two episodes of the Adjara State TV series Etnopori, which focuses on bearers of ethnic tradition, were dedicated to the choir.

References

Georgian choirs
A cappella musical groups
Musical groups from Georgia (country)
Musical groups established in 2009
2009 establishments in Georgia (country)